Kazakhstan Academy of Sciences (official name National Academy of Sciences of the Republic of Kazakhstan) is the highest scientific organization of the Republic of Kazakhstan. The Academy of Sciences was founded on 1 June 1946 on the basis of the Kazakh branch of the USSR Academy of Sciences. The central office is located in Almaty. It is a state institution that joins active members (academicians), corresponding members, and leading scientists of Kazakhstan. 

The main activities of the Academy are scientific research, analysis and forecasting of the development of science, priorities of science development and scientific personnel training, support, formation, and coordination of scientific programs, promotion of international cooperation, innovation and investment in science-based development. Areas of research include earth sciences, mathematics, computer science, physics, remote sensing and space technologies, chemistry, new materials, biologically active substances, biochemistry and physiology of plants, botany, soil sciences, social sciences and humanities. The incumbent president (as of 2022) is Professor Murat Zhurinov.

History of Academy 
The first scientific institutions appeared in the territory of the Republic of Kazakhstan at the beginning of the 20th century. At the first stage, these were agricultural institutions that was conducting research on seed variety.

Kazakh branch of the USSR Academy of Sciences 
The history of the Academy dates back to March 8, 1932, when the Presidium of the USSR Academy of Sciences, at the request of the government of the Kazakh ASSR , decided to organize a scientific base in Kazakhstan in Almaty. The new organization created in the same year included the zoological and botanical sectors. In November 1938, the base was transformed into the Kazakh branch of the USSR Academy of Sciences (KazFAN of the USSR). This was the largest institution in the republic, which employed 100 scientists, including 3 doctors and 14 candidates of sciences - before the start of World War II.

By the beginning of the 1940s, there were 12 universities, 11 research & development and design-technological organizations, 2 design institutes, 2 agricultural experimental stations, 6 factory research and design divisions, a botanical garden and a zoological park in the republic and the city of Almaty.

The Academy of Sciences of the KazakhSSR 
On October 26, 1945 a resolution of the Council of People's Commissars of the USSR was issued on the organization of the Academy of Sciences in Kazakhstan. Therefore the Academy of Sciences of the Kazakh SSR was established on June 1, 1946 by decree of the Presidium of the Supreme Soviet, Council of Ministers of the Kazakh SSR and the Central Committee of the Communist Party of Kazakhstan and became the main science headquarter of the republic and the coordinator of scientific research works in Kazakhstan. From the first years of its establishment, the National Academy of Sciences of the republic launched a broad study on the development of rich natural resources, which has made a significant contribution to the development of the productive forces of the country in solving the most important problems of an economic, social and spiritual development of Kazakhstan's society.

National Academy of Sciences of Kazakhstan 
In 1996, by a decree of the President of Kazakhstan, the National Academy of Sciences, the Kazakh Academy of Agricultural Sciences and the Ministry of Science and New Technologies of the Republic of Kazakhstan merged into the central executive body of the Government of the Republic of Kazakhstan  - “Ministry of Science - National Academy of Sciences of the Republic of Kazakhstan”.

In 1999, the Academy of Sciences was separated from the ministry, while all academic institutions remained part of the ministry. The Academy is a public association.

In 2003, in accordance with the Decree of the President of the Republic of Kazakhstan, The Academy was given the status of the Republican private association "National academy of sciences of the Republic of Kazakhstan".

Academy Presidents

 Kanysh Satbayev (1946–52, 1955–64)
 Dinmukhamed Kunaev (1952–55)
 Shafik Chokin (1964–67)
 Shahmardan Yesenov (1967–74)
 Askar Kunaev (1974–86)
 Murat Aitkhozhin (1986–87)
 Umirzak Sultangazin (1987–94)
 Kenzhegali Sagadiev (1994–96)
 Vladimir Shkolnik (1996–99)
 Nagima Aitkhozhina (1999-2002)
 Serikbek Daukeev (2002–03)
 Murat Zhurinov (2003–present)

Notable academy members

Full Members (Academians) 

Kanysh Satbayev — Geologist and First President.
Mikhail Rusakov — Geologist
Dinmukhamed Kunaev — Engineer (and later politician)
Shafik Chokin — Power Engineer 
Nikolai Vasilievich Pavlov — Botanist
Murat Aitkhozhin — Molecular Biologist
Nadir Nadirov — Chemist
Maya Shigaeva — Microbiologist
Orazak Ismagulov — Anthropologist
Askar Dzhumadildayev — Mathematician

Corresponding Members 

 Sarsen Amanzholov — Linguist

Academy departments 

From the late 1980s to 1999, the structure of the Academy of Sciences included five departments (by field of science) and one regional branch of the Academy of Sciences:

Department of Physical and Mathematical Science 

 Institute of Nuclear Physics
 Institute of High Energy Physics
 Institute of Theoretical and Applied Mathematics
 Fesenkov Astrophysical Institute
 Kamenskoe Plateau Observatory
 Assy-Turgen observatory
 Tien Shan Astronomical Observatory
 Ionosphere Institute
 Physical-Technical Institute
 Institute of Mechanics and Mechanical Engineering
 Institute of Space Research
 Institute of Informatics and Control Problems

Department of Geological Sciences 

 Institute of Geological Sciences named after K. Satpayev
 U. M. Ahmedsafin Institute of Hydrogeology and Geoecology
 Institute of seismology
 Institute of mining engineering
 Institute of Geography

Department of Chemical and Technological Sciences 

 Institute of Metallurgy and Concentration
 A. B. Bekturov Institute of Chemical Sciences
 D. V. Sokolsky Institute of Organic Catalysis and Electrochemistry
 Institute of Petroleum Chemistry and Natural Salts

Department of Biological Sciences 

 Institute of General Genetics and Cytology
 Institute of Soil Science
 Institute of Botany
 Institute of Zoology
 Institute of Microbiology and Virology
 Institute of Experimental Biology
 Institute of Physiology
 Institute of M. Aitkhozhin Molecular Biology and Biochemistry
 Main botanical garden
 Scientific Center for Regional Nutrition Problems

Department of Social Sciences 

 Institute of Philosophy
 Institute of State and Law
 Institute of Economics
 Institute of History and Ethnology named after Ch. Ch. Valikhanov
 M. O. Auezov Institute of literature and art
 Baitursynov Institute of Linguistics
 Institute of Uigur science
 A. Kh. Margulan Institute of Archeology
 Center of foreign economics
 Center for Oriental Studies

Central Kazakhstani branch in Karaganda 

 Chemical and Metallurgical Institute
 Institute of Organic Synthesis and Carbon Chemistry
 Institute of Physiology and Labor Hygiene
 Institute of Applied Mathematics
 Institute for Problems of Integrated Subsoil Development

References

External links
 Kazakhstan Academy of Science on The Interacademy Panel site.

Kazakhstan
Kazakhstan
Scientific organizations based in Kazakhstan
1946 establishments in the Soviet Union
Scientific organizations established in 1946
Members of the International Council for Science
Members of the International Science Council